Milkha is a given name. Notable people with the name include:

A. G. Milkha Singh (born 1941), Indian Test cricketer
Jeev Milkha Singh (born 1971), Indian golfer 
Milkha Singh (1929 – 2021), Indian athlete also known as "The Flying Sikh"

Indian given names